Bimal Mitra (born 9 October 1914, date of death unknown) was an Indian cricketer. He played six first-class matches for Bengal between 1938 and 1944.

See also
 List of Bengal cricketers

References

1914 births
Year of death missing
Indian cricketers
Bengal cricketers
Cricketers from Kolkata